is a Japanese magical girl anime series created by illustrator and animator Ikuko Itoh. Inspired by ballet and fairy tales, particularly The Ugly Duckling and Swan Lake, the story follows a duck who is transformed into the mythical ballerina Princess Tutu in order to save the shattered heart of a storybook prince come to life.

The first season was broadcast in Japan in 2002 and the second in 2002 and 2003. It was also adapted into a two-volume manga. Both the manga and anime series were licensed by ADV Films in 2004 for distribution in North America, then by AEsir Holdings when ADV Films closed in 2009, while Sentai Filmworks distributed the Blu-Ray release of the show, as the latter two are parts of Section23 Films. The series explores the concepts of destiny and free will. Reviewers point out that although Princess Tutu is nominally a magical girl series, it is more of a "fairy tale set to ballet with a few magical girl elements mixed in," and its use of dance in lieu of violence to solve conflicts carries "surprisingly effective emotional appeal."

Plot

Once there was a writer named Drosselmeyer, who had the power to make his stories come to life. But he died before he could finish his final tale, The Prince and the Raven, leaving the two title characters locked in an eternal battle. After many years, the Raven managed to break free into the real world, and the Prince pursued him. To seal away the Raven's evil, Prince Siegfried shattered his own heart with his sword, causing him to lose all his memories and emotions.

Drosselmeyer, having used his power to write himself as part of the tale to preserve his consciousness, laments that the story has reached a standstill and wants it to become a never-ending tragedy. He finds a useful tool to restart the flow of the story in the form of a little duck, who has fallen in love with Mytho, the empty remainder of Siegfried. He gives her a magic pendant that can transform her, first into an ordinary human girl, then into the graceful ballerina Princess Tutu, another character in the story. As Tutu, it's Duck's job to find all the scattered shards of Mytho's heart and return them to him.

But not everyone wants Mytho to get his heart back. Rue, the Raven's daughter reborn as a human, has fallen in love with him too, and worries he might not return her feelings if he has a heart. Her desire to stop him from regaining his emotions unleashes her ability to transform into Princess Kraehe, Tutu's evil counterpart. Fakir, the boy who found and took care of Mytho after he escaped the story, also tries to stop Tutu, fearing that the story progressing means the Raven will return and Mytho will have to risk his life fighting it again.

What's more, Duck learns that part of Princess Tutu's story is that she can never confess her love to Mytho, or else she'll turn into a speck of light and vanish. However, it becomes clear that Mytho wants his heart restored, so despite Fakir and Kraehe's interference, she persists.

Eventually, Fakir accepts Mytho's choice and decides to help Tutu, even discovering her true identity as a Duck and becoming good friends with her. He also learns he's a descendant of Drosselmeyer, meaning he too has the power to make what he writes a reality. Rue finds out she's not the Raven's daughter, but a human child he stole to serve him.

After most of Mytho's heart is returned to him, the seal trapping the Raven begins to break. Finally able to feel love again, Mytho realizes he loves Rue – just as the Raven kidnaps her. Duck discovers her pendant is the final shard, meaning she must give up her life as a human to return it. She eventually finds the courage to do so, and becomes a humble duck again.

Mytho and the Raven battle once more. When the fight turns bleak, Mytho considers shattering his heart to seal the monster away again. Duck begins dancing to show him he must not give up. As she does, Fakir writes a story about how she never stops, no matter how many times the Raven's minions attack her. Together they create hope, which gives Mytho the strength he needs to rescue Rue and defeat the Raven. Mytho asks Rue to be his princess and they return to his kingdom inside the story. Duck, now stuck in her original duck form, and Fakir remain together, although the narrator implies that Fakir is writing a new story. With nothing left to do, Drosselmeyer departs in search of another story.

Media

Anime

Princess Tutu was conceptualized by Ikuko Itoh, who also designed the characters, and directed by Junichi Sato and Shogo Koumoto, with Michiko Yokote handling series composition and Kaoru Wada composing the music. It was produced by Hal Film Maker and TUTU, a production committee consisting of King Records, IMAGICA Imageworks, Dentsu, Marvelous Entertainment and Memory-Tech. The series originally aired in two seasons. The first season, "Kapitel des Eies" ("Chapter of the Egg"), consisted of 13 half-hour episodes. The second season, "Kapitel des Junges" ("Chapter of the Fledgling") in R2 DVDs, and "Kapital des Kükens" ("Chapter of the Chick") in R1 DVDs, was aired as 25 quarter-hour episodes and one half-hour episode; to conform to the format of the time slot,  each episode was halved. These were brought back together in the DVD release as 13 complete episodes.

North American release
In 2004, ADV Films announced that they had licensed the anime series for distribution in North America. ADV Films produced English adaptations for all episodes and, beginning in 2005, the series was periodically released as single DVD "volumes" that each contained several episodes. In 2007, the series was released as a complete DVD collection of all 26 episodes.

In 2011, AEsir Holdings announced the licensing of the series and the release of a complete DVD collection of all 26 episodes distributed by Section23 Films.

In 2018, as AEsir Holdings and Sentai Filmworks are parts of Section23 Films, the latter released a complete Blu-ray collection of all 26 episodes on December 11, 2018. Steelbook release was made on December 21, 2021.

Anime Network formerly offered all 26 episodes of the series, English dubbed only, from their internet streaming site for North America. After the service was shut down, the series was moved to Hidive. Hulu and Amazon Prime Instant Video both have the English dub available for streaming.

Manga
A manga adaptation of the anime series was published in Japan by Akita Shoten in the shōnen (later seinen) manga magazine Champion Red from August 19, 2002 to May 19, 2003. The manga was written by Mizuo Shinonome and series creator Ikuko Itoh and illustrated by Shinonome. Two tankōbon volumes of the manga series were published in 2003. The manga was translated to English and published in North America by ADV Manga in 2004 and 2005.

Volume list

Note: The English language manga continues to use the Japanese name "Ahiru" rather than the name "Duck" used in the English language version of the anime television series.

Reception
The series has been reviewed many times, starting from the Japanese language streams, through the latest North American English language DVD releases. Generally the reviews are very positive.

 The first DVD volume (DVD 1) included episodes 1 through 5. Theron Martin reviewed this volume for the Anime News Network and awarded grades from "C+" (art) to "A" (music).
 The second DVD volume (DVD 2) included episodes 6 through 9. Zac Bertschy reviewed this volume for the Anime News Network and awarded grades from "B+" (story) to "A" (most everything else).
 The fourth DVD volume (DVD 4) included episodes 14 through 18. Theron Martin reviewed this volume and awarded grades from "B" (animation) to "A+" (music).
 The sixth DVD volume (DVD 6) included episodes 23 through 26. Theron Martin reviewed this volume and awarded grades from "B+" (animation & art) to "A+" (music).
 The 2011 Complete Collection (DVD) release was reviewed by Chris Beveridge for the media blog The Fandom Post and given an overall grade of A−.

References

External links

Madman Entertainment site

 
2002 anime television series debuts
2002 manga
ADV Films
ADV Manga
Akita Shoten manga
Anime and manga based on fairy tales
Anime with original screenplays
Dance in anime and manga
Tutu
Tutu
Hal Film Maker
Madman Entertainment anime
Magical girl anime and manga
Marvelous Entertainment franchises
Metafictional television series
Music in anime and manga
NHK original programming
Sentai Filmworks
Shōnen manga
Swan Lake
Television series about ballet
Television series about princesses
Television shows based on works by Hans Christian Andersen
Works based on The Ugly Duckling